Paul Woodfull (born 1957 in Dublin) is an Irish writer, actor, comedian and musician. He has written two television series, a CD and the comedy musical play I, Keano. He is a graduate of the National College of Art and Design in Dublin.

Performing career
Woodfull was a member of the Skank Mooks in the late 1970s, the band was one of the original and most influential of the Dublin punk/new wave bands of the era. He also created, and performed in, various musical tribute groups, including the Joshua Trio, the Glam Tarts and Abbaesque. The Joshua Trio was a spoof U2 tribute act which featured on The Last Resort with Jonathan Ross, with Woodfull as Paul Wonderful, a messianic singer with a religious devotion to Bono. The others in the trio were Woodfull's brother Kieran and Arthur Mathews.

Woodfull's other performance alter egos include DJ Gary on RTÉ 2fm (1998–2006); lounge singer Tony St James; and republican balladeer Ding Dong Denny O’Reilly. In 2000, he appeared as Ding Dong Denny O'Reilly in the movie When Brendan Met Trudy.

Theatre
Woodfull, with Arthur Mathews and Michael Nugent, co-wrote I, Keano, a comedy musical play about the  Saipan incident in which footballer Roy Keane left the Republic of Ireland team before the 2002 World Cup. It is presented as a mock-epic melodrama about an ancient Roman legion preparing for war. In its first two years, over half a million people watched it, generating €10m ($13m) in ticket sales. In January 2008, it began its fourth year of performances.

Television
Stew is an Irish comedy sketch series. Woodfull and Paul Tylak wrote and performed in it. It won Best Entertainment Series at the Irish Film and Television Awards in 2005 and at the Celtic Film & Television Festival in 2006.

This Is Ireland was a comedy sketch series about Ireland made for the BBC.

Paul also written and acted  in sketches in Irish Pictorial Weekly as well as in Val Falvey TD on RTÉ.

Paul played Father Harry Coyle in Father Ted ("Competition Time"), who impersonated Ziggy Stardust.

Writing
 Publocked, CD as Ding Dong Denny O’Reilly, 1996
 Ding Dong Merrily on High, televised concert as Ding Dong Denny O'Reilly, RTÉ, 2004
 This is Ireland, TV series with Arthur Mathews and Paul Tylak, BBC, 2004
 Stew, TV series with Paul Tylak, RTÉ, 2004–2005
 I, Keano, comedy musical play with and Michael Nugent, 2005

References

External links
 Paul Woodfull at IrishPlayography.Com

1958 births
Living people
Irish comedy musicians
Irish comedy writers
Irish dramatists and playwrights
Irish male dramatists and playwrights
Irish humorists
Irish male comedians
Irish songwriters
Irish male television actors
Irish television writers
Musicians from Dublin (city)
Male television writers